Palo Alto Battlefield National Historical Park near Brownsville, Texas, United States, is a National Park Service unit which preserves the grounds of the May 8, 1846, Battle of Palo Alto. It was the first major conflict in a border dispute that soon precipitated the Mexican–American War. The United States Army victory here made the invasion of Mexico possible. The historic site portrays the battle and the war, and its causes and consequences, from the perspectives of both the United States and Mexico.

The National Park Service has acquired a little more than a third of the authorized land for the park, including the  southern core battlefield tract, which served as the location for Mexican forces during the Battle of Palo Alto. Honey Mesquite (Prosopis glandulosa), although a native plant, is present in an unusually high concentration, altering the cultural landscape and threatening the natural and cultural resources at the park.

The park's visitor center features exhibits about the battle and the Mexican–American War, as well as a 15-minute video titled "War on the Rio Grande". A half-mile trail leads to an overlook of the battlefield and includes interpretive panels.

Background 
The Battle of Palo Alto, fought on May 8, 1846, near modern Brownsville, Texas, was the first battle of the Mexican–American War. On April 30, 1846, Mexican federal troops under the command of General Mariano Arista crossed the Rio Grande into the disputed territory east of the river with the intention of attacking American General  Zachary Taylor's forward base, Fort Texas. Taylor, expecting Fort Texas to be invested, took his main force approximately 20 miles east to protect his main supply base, Fort Polk, leaving 500 men, under Major Jacob Brown, to garrison the forward base. Arista's investment of Fort Texas began on May 3 and continued for several days, during which time Major Brown was mortally wounded. On May 7 Taylor departed Fort Polk, on the coast near Port Isabel, and began to move west towards the relief of Fort Texas. Arista, given timely intelligence of Taylor's departure, moved his main force to block Taylor along the Port Isabel Road. The two armies met the next day, May 8, when Taylor's columns engaged the Mexican line around 2 P.M. The Americans repulsed an initial cavalry charge to their right, and were then able to advance 1,000 yards when a grass fire forced Arista's line back. After a second failed cavalry charge, Arista advanced on the American left but was driven back by the quick and accurate fire of the American light artillery. Eager to seize the initiative from Arista, a mixed force of infantry and dragoons pressed forward against the retreating Mexican right, eventually driving them from the field. After dusk ended the fighting, Arista began to pull his forces away from the battlefield to a more defensible position in a dry river bed to the south. Taylor pursued the following day, leading to the Battle of Resaca de la Palma, on May 9.

While the battle was a clear American victory and casualties were very light, 5 dead and 43 wounded, two of the dead were the resolute commander of Fort Texas, Major Brown, and the innovative artillery officer Major Samuel Ringgold, whose fast and mobile "flying artillery" would continue to be a major advantage to Taylor throughout the campaign.

Administrative history

Palo Alto Battlefield was designated a National Historic Landmark on December 19, 1960. It became Palo Alto Battlefield National Historic Site on November 10, 1978, with a boundary change authorized on June 23, 1992. Establishing legislation in 1991 was sponsored by Rep. Solomon Ortiz.

On March 30, 2009 the site was redesignated a National Historical Park, and the park was expanded to include the Resaca de la Palma Battlefield, which is a separate 34 acres inside the Brownsville city limits.

The Consolidated Appropriations Act, 2023 authorized the addition of Fort Brown (166 acres) to Palo Alto Battlefield National Historical Park if a study finds it feasible.

See also

 List of National Historic Landmarks in Texas
 National Register of Historic Places listings in Cameron County, Texas

References

 The National Parks: Index 2001–2003. Washington: U.S. Department of the Interior.

External links

 Official NPS website: Palo Alto Battlefield National Historical Park
 Palo Alto Battlefield NHL information
 National Park Lover Page: Palo Alto Battlefield National Historical Park
Out ‘N About with Jimmy and George - "The Battle of Palo Alto" from the Texas Archive of the Moving Image

Protected areas of Cameron County, Texas
Mexican–American War
National Historical Parks of the United States
National Historic Landmarks in Texas
Museums in Cameron County, Texas
Military and war museums in Texas
Protected areas established in 1978
National Park Service areas in Texas
1978 establishments in Texas
Conflict sites on the National Register of Historic Places in Texas
National Register of Historic Places in Cameron County, Texas
Parks on the National Register of Historic Places in Texas